Townsend is an unincorporated census-designated place located in the town of Townsend, Oconto County, Wisconsin, United States. Townsend has a post office with ZIP code 54175. As of the 2010 census, its population is 146.

References

Census-designated places in Oconto County, Wisconsin
Census-designated places in Wisconsin